David Griffiths (31 March 1874 – 5 September 1931) was a Welsh sports shooter. He competed for Great Britain in two events at the 1912 Summer Olympics.

References

External links
 

1874 births
1931 deaths
Welsh male sport shooters
Olympic shooters of Great Britain
Shooters at the 1912 Summer Olympics
Sportspeople from Maesteg
British male sport shooters